The Mawson Trail is a long-distance cycling and walking trail in South Australia starting just east of Adelaide in the Adelaide Hills and extending almost  to Blinman in the Flinders Ranges. It is suitable for mountain bikes.

The Mawson Trail traverses remote areas of the Mount Lofty and Flinders Ranges, mostly away from bitumen roads, and often off-road on tracks and unmade road or forest reserves. It also passes through a number of country towns. It starts at the upstream end of the Torrens Linear Park on Gorge Road, leading into the Adelaide Hills, so that it is directly connected by dedicated pedestrian/cycleway to the coast at West Beach.

BikeSA hosts a guided two-week tour of the entire length every second year.

The trail is named after explorer Douglas Mawson.

Route 
The route is generally described south-to-north, although it can be ridden in either direction. Signage along the route is provided for both directions.

The towns passed through are:
 Adelaide (outskirts)
 Lobethal, a historic town with German settler history
 Birdwood, home of the National Motor Museum
 Rowland Flat, a town in the Barossa Valley
 Tanunda, a large town with bakeries, pubs and cafes in the Barossa Valley
 Nuriootpa, main commercial centre of the Barossa valley
 Kapunda, with cafes, supermarkets and pubs
 Riverton, with pubs and cafes
 Auburn, with a pub and cafes
 Clare, a large town with a large supermarket, bike shop and cafes
 Burra, a large historical town with several pubs, supermarkets and cafes
 Hallett, with a service station/general store and a pub
 Spalding, with a general store and pub with barbed wire museum
 (Near Jamestown)
 Laura, with a supermarket and cafes
 Melrose, with a bike shop cafe, two pubs, and several cafes
 Wilmington, with a pub, general store and cafe
 Quorn, a large historical town with four pubs and several cafes
 Cradock, a tiny hamlet with a pub
 Hawker, a small town with a roadhouse/general store and a cafe
 Rawnsley Park Station, a caravan park with pub and general store
 Wilpena, a very large caravan and campsite with pub, general store and information office
 Blinman, a small tourist village with pub and mine tours

See also
List of long-distance hiking tracks in Australia

References

External links
Mawson Trail (South Australian Government webpage)
Mawson Trail Blog Article and full guide and maps

Cycling in South Australia
Cycleways in South Australia